Violet Hill, also known as Tsz Lo Lan Shan, is located within Tai Tam Country Park in Hong Kong. The hill is a popular site for hiking. The Hong Kong Government named three trails on the hill, namely Wilson Trail, Tsz Lo Lan Shan Path and Tai Tam Country Trail. Towards the top of the hill, it splits into three peaks of altitude ,  and  respectively. It offers views of the group of Tai Tam Reservoirs and Wong Nai Chung Reservoir. The hill is well preserved, with little construction on the hill. A rare and protected species, Hong Kong iris (Iris speculatrix) with violet flower can be found on the hill.

Geography
The hill is situated in mid-southern Hong Kong Island. Apart from the shore of Deep Water Bay and Repulse Bay in its southwest, the hill is surrounded by valleys with other hills on the island. With Mount Nicholson in its northwest, it forms a crossroad of Wong Nai Chung Gap where Wong Nai Chung Reservoir is sited. With Mount Butler in its northeast and Jardine's Lookout in the north, a valley leads to Tai Tam Reservoir in its east, an important water supply construction in the early colonial history of Hong Kong. Another mountain pass Tsin Shui Wan Au forms with The Twins and Cheung Lin Shan allows one runs from Tai Tam Intermediate Reservoir to the Repulse Bay.

History
During World War II, the hill was part of the hostilities near Wong Nai Chung Gap during the Battle of Hong Kong and was used by Japanese forces with field guns to shell Aberdeen.

Hiking
Violet Hill is a part of the first stage of the Wilson Trail from Stanley. The trail first passes The Twins, then to Violet Hill. Another trail, Tsz Lo Lan Shan Path, winds west side of the hill along the catchwater of Wong Nai Chung Reservoir and goes southward from Wong Nai Chung Reservoir to Tsin Shui Wan Au. Hikers starting from Wong Nai Chung Reservoir may also use Tai Tam Country Trail to go up to the summit of Violet Hill along the north ridge.

Road access
There is no road access up the hill. Two surrounding roads, Repulse Bay Road and Tai Tam Reservoir Road lead from Wong Nai Chung Gap to Repulse Bay and Tai Tam Reservoir respectively.

See also

List of mountains, peaks and hills in Hong Kong
The Twins

References

Mountains, peaks and hills of Hong Kong
Tai Tam